The following are the association football events of the year 1924 throughout the world.

Events

Clubs formed in 1924
7 August: Foundation of club Peruvian Universitario de Deportes and Colombian Junior de Barranquilla
July: Foundation of Bulgarian FC Sportist Svoge

Winners club national championship
Belgium: Germinal Beerschot
Denmark: B 1903
England: Huddersfield Town
Germany: 1. FC Nürnberg
Greece: Regional Championships: 
EPSA (Athens) Apollonas Athinon
EPSM (Thessaloniki) Aris 
EPSP (Patras) Panachaiki
Hungary: MTK Hungária
Iceland: Víkingur
Italy: Genoa 1893
Kingdom of Serbs, Croats and Slovenes: SK Jugoslavija
Netherlands: Feyenoord Rotterdam
Poland: Championships did not take place due to preparations of national team to 1924 Paris, France Olympic Games
Scotland: For fuller coverage, see 1923–24 in Scottish football.
Scottish Division One – Rangers
Scottish Cup – Airdrieonians
Turkey: Harbiye Talimgah

International tournaments
1924 British Home Championship (October 20, 1923 – April 12, 1924)

Olympic Games in Paris, France (May 25 – June 9, 1924)
 
  
 
1924-28 Nordic Football Championship (June 15, 1924 – October 7, 1928) 1924: (June 15 – September 21, 1924)
 (1924)
 (1924–1928)

South American Championship 1924 in Uruguay (October 12, 1924 – November 2, 1924)

Births
 17 February: Raimon Carrasco, Spanish businessman and 34th President of FC Barcelona (died 2022)
 6 March: Ottmar Walter, German international footballer (died 2013)
 13 March: Raúl Córdoba, Mexican international footballer (died 2017)
 22 March: Bill Roost, English footballer (died 2013)
 25 June: Dimitar Isakov, Bulgarian footballer

Deaths 

 November 20 – Ebenezer Cobb Morley, English sportsman, former FA president, regarded as the father of the FA and modern football. (93)

References 

 
Association football by year